The Cathedral of Tomorrow was a Pentecostal church located in Cuyahoga Falls, Ohio.

History
The building was built in 1958 by Rex Humbard.  The Cathedral, a round building with the sanctuary in the middle and classrooms and offices around the edges, seats 5,400. It has a domed roof with a large illuminated cross that hangs from the ceiling. The cross weighs 32 tons (to give the domed roof greater architectural strength during wind storms) and is illuminated with 4,700 lights which can change colors. It is one of the largest interior crosses in the world. When the cathedral was built, it was the largest permanently domed building in the world without interior pillar support. This gives the audience greater visibility toward the stage.

Under Humbard's ministry, Cathedral services were broadcast on 600 television stations in the United States and Canada, as well as on stations in many other countries. 

The influential gospel quartet the Cathedral Quartet was formed at the Cathedral of Tomorrow (hence the group's name), originally as a trio.

Cathedral Tower
In 1971, Humbard began to build a  rotating tower restaurant, similar to Calgary Tower, at his Cathedral of Tomorrow complex, which was also slated to hold a transmission tower for his planned local TV station, WCOT-TV (Channel 55; the license was later used by current day (now former) CW affiliate WBNX-TV).

Neighbors filed lawsuits and Northampton Township, the community governing the Cathedral complex at that time, said that there were no provisions for water and sewer service for the tower. The actual reason for the end of construction is still an open issue.

In 1973, Humbard announced scaled-back plans to house a museum, library and prayer center in the tower. By 1978, the project was still unfinished, with Humbard saying "Someday we'll finish it, and it'll be a landmark."

In 1989 local grocer and lone bidder Mike Krieger bid $30,000 to win the auction at a sheriff's sale held to raise money to pay toward debts owed to the tower's builder. The tower later saw use as a cellular phone tower.

Legacy

After Humbard moved his ministry to Florida in the 1980s, the Cathedral of Tomorrow remained in operation as a local church, with services conducted by local pastors who had increasingly fewer ties with the Humbard family. As a result, attendances began to dwindle. However, Humbard would continue to guest-speak on occasion.

In 1994, the Cathedral was sold to the Reverend Ernest Angley's ministry, and was rededicated as Grace Cathedral, the name of Angley's previous house of worship. It's adjacent to an office complex that contains a diorama museum called The Life Of Christ which was a lifelong sculpture work by artist Paul Cunningham, and a very popular family style restaurant called the Cathedral Buffet.

Angley also purchased the Cathedral of Tomorrow's television studio facilities in the mid-1980s, which are used to produce his own television programs and house the offices of WBNX-TV, the Cathedral Buffet restaurant as well as other leased office space.

In 1999 and in 2017, the United States Department of Labor filed suit against the Cathedral Buffet, both of which were filed due to the restaurant not properly paying their employees. In the 2017 lawsuit, it was argued by Angley that the employees were actually "volunteers", and that they had prices that were so cheap that they could not stay in business unless they didn't pay them. The court found him guilty in both instances and fined him $37,000 and $388,000 respectively in damages and wages. Since the 2017 lawsuit, the Cathedral Buffet has been closed.  In April 2018, the 6th Circuit Court of Appeals reversed the lower court's decision finding there was no violation of the Fair Labor Standards Act (FLSA)  The appeals court found the volunteers had no expectation of compensation.

References

Evangelical churches in Ohio
Churches in Summit County, Ohio
Churches completed in 1958
Former megachurches
Cuyahoga Falls, Ohio
Former Pentecostal churches